Andkær is a small town in Southern Jutland, Denmark. It is located eight kilometres to the south-east of Vejle. It is part of Vejle Municipality, and has a population of 360 (1 January 2022).

Notable people 
 Gulddreng (born 1994 in Andkær), stage name of Malte Ebert, a Danish musician

References

Cities and towns in the Region of Southern Denmark
Vejle Municipality